Andreas Lind (13 July 1922 - 26 January 1982) was a Danish sprint canoeist who competed in the early 1950s. He won two medals at the 1950 ICF Canoe Sprint World Championships in Copenhagen with a silver in the K-1 4 x 500 m: and a bronze in the K-1 500 m.

Lind also competed at the 1952 Summer Olympics in Helsinki, finishing ninth in the K-2 1000 m event.

References

Sports-reference.com profile

1922 births
1982 deaths
Canoeists at the 1952 Summer Olympics
Danish male canoeists
Olympic canoeists of Denmark
ICF Canoe Sprint World Championships medalists in kayak